Neelapu Rami Reddy (born 1 June 1965) is a former sprinter and national athletics champion from Andhra Pradesh, India. He dominated national competition for over a decade during the 1980s and the first half of the 1990s. After his retirement from competitive sports in 1994, he was made athletics chief coach by Southern Central Railways (SCR) and sprints coach of the Indian Railways.

References

Living people
Indian male sprinters
Sportspeople from Visakhapatnam
1965 births
Athletes from Andhra Pradesh